Joslins Department Store began as J. Joslins Dry Goods Store, founded by John Jay Joslin in 1873; It was a direct competitor to The Denver Dry Goods Company which commenced operations in 1888.  The downtown Joslins building in Denver, Colorado, is on the  U.S. National Register of Historic Places, and is currently a Courtyard by Marriott property.

History

J. Joslins Dry Goods later converted to a department store in the 1930s and was purchased by Mercantile Stores, a Fairfield, Ohio-based department store conglomerate.  Mercantile Stores retained the Joslin's name, operating until 1998 when the purchase of Mercantile Stores and the conversion to the Dillard's store brand were completed.

References

CURTAIN FALLS ON JOSLINS DILLARD'S PICKS UP RETAIL CHAIN FOR $3 BILLION IN CASH AND ASSUMED DEBT

Retail companies established in 1873
Defunct department stores based in Colorado
Companies based in Denver
Retail companies disestablished in 1998
Defunct companies based in Colorado